The 2018 TAC Cup season was the 27th season of the TAC Cup competition. The season was won by the Dandenong Stingrays who have claimed there first premiership title after five despite losses in grand finals, they defeated the Oakleigh Chargers in the grand final by 1 goal.

Ladder

Finals series

Finals Week 1

Finals Week 2

Finals Week 3

Grand Final

References

NAB League
Nab League